Charlize van der Westhuizen (born 17 February 1984) is a South African former cricketer who played as a right-handed batter and slow left-arm orthodox bowler. She appeared in two Test matches, 33 One Day Internationals and 12 Twenty20 Internationals for South Africa between 2003 and 2010. She played domestic cricket for Northerns.

References

External links
 
 

1977 births
Living people
Cricketers from Pretoria
Afrikaner people
South African women cricketers
South Africa women Test cricketers
South Africa women One Day International cricketers
South Africa women Twenty20 International cricketers
Northerns women cricketers